The House Bunny is a 2008 American comedy film directed by Fred Wolf, written by Kirsten Smith and Karen McCullah Lutz, and produced by Adam Sandler, Jack Giarraputo, Anna Faris, Allen Covert, and Heather Parry. The film stars Faris, Colin Hanks, and Emma Stone, and tells the story of a former Playboy bunny who signs up to be the "house mother" of an unpopular university sorority after finding out she must leave the Playboy Mansion.

Produced by Adam Sandler's Happy Madison Productions in association with Alta Loma Entertainment and Relativity Media, The House Bunny was released in the United States on August 22, 2008, by Columbia Pictures. It received mixed reviews, but was a box office success, making $70.4 million on a $25 million budget. The film and its soundtrack have gained a cult following.

Plot
Shelley Darlingson is an aspiring Playboy Playmate living the life of luxury in the Playboy Mansion with Hugh Hefner. The day after her 27th birthday, she awakes to find a note, seemingly from Hugh Hefner, asking her to pack up and leave. The note is later revealed to be a forgery by jealous rival Playmate Cassandra.

Shelley happens to stumble upon a group of girls who remind her of herself: beautiful and fun. She follows them and sees that they live in luxury too. They turn out to be the Phi Iota Mu sorority, and though she is unable to join them because she is not a student, she tries to become a house mother, but the house mothers snobbishly reject her when she tries to join them.

Shelley makes her way down to the Zeta Alpha Zeta house, which appears to be far less luxurious than the first sorority she visited. The members of the Zeta house are dowdy, socially awkward, and caught off guard by Shelley's bubbly nature, prompting them to initially reject her. Once they see Shelley's ability to attract boys, the Zetas change their mind and take in Shelley as their new "house mother", hoping that she can save them: their sorority is in danger of being shut down unless they can get thirty new pledges to join.

During her time spent with the Zetas, Shelley meets and becomes attracted to an intellectual, altruistic guy named Oliver, who works at a retirement home. Shelley goes out on a date with Oliver and while her flirty tactics work with most guys, they fail with him for he is a guy who actually wants to get to know Shelley rather than just sleep with her. To impress Oliver on their upcoming second date, Shelley starts attending classes and reading books, and tones down her appearance. The second date is also a disaster because she wears glasses that are not meant for her, and brings along note cards to help her sound smart.

Having gotten a makeover and lessons on how to attract guys and be popular, the Zetas throw a party, which is a huge success. Later, the Zetas are reviewing the girls who are hoping to pledge to Zeta. However, Lilly, a British Zeta sister with social anxiety, reveals how their new popularity has made them conceited, thus forgetting the true value of sisterhood. When they realize what they have become, they blame Shelley—just as she returns from her unsuccessful date.

Although Shelley had just been invited back to the Playboy Mansion after Hefner had learned of the forged dismissal and decided to stay with the Zetas, the unexpected attack from them makes her reconsider and she calls back to accept the invitation. The Zetas then feel guilty and decide to give themselves a second makeover, this time being "Half-Shelley and Half-Themselves". They also decide to draw the pledges out at random instead of judging them for their physical looks and popularity. They show up at Shelley's photo shoot and ask for her to come back, to which she agrees, having changed her mind about her dream of being a centerfold.

The rival Phi Iota Mu sorority intercepts the invitations and prevents them from being mailed out, so the Zetas are again in danger of being shut down at the campus meeting of the Panhellenic Council. Shelley crashes the meeting and gives a heartfelt speech about what her experience with the Zetas has taught her about love and acceptance and asks for pledges on the spot; gradually thirty students agree to pledge, and the sorority is saved. Oliver and Shelley reconcile, and Shelley explains that she likes Oliver a lot and was trying too hard to impress him. They decide to start over with their relationship and Oliver is looking forward to getting to know the "real" Shelley.

The film ends with the Zetas and their new pledges celebrating. Shelley has remained in close contact with Hefner and her friends at the Playboy Mansion.

Cast

Production

Anna Faris originally pitched the idea of a Playboy bunny kicked out of the mansion to screenwriters Karen McCullah and Kirsten Smith. In Faris' initial pitch, the story had a darker tone and revolved around a Playboy model returning to the midwest and falling into drugs. A few months later, the screenwriters combined it with an idea they'd had about a mismatched sorority house and house mother. The line "eyes are the nipples of the face" is, to the writers, "one of our proudest accomplishments, which really shows you how weird our job is."

The trio eventually landed a meeting with Adam Sandler's company, Happy Madison Productions, when a producer got wind of their idea. Sandler, who had previously worked with Faris on The Hot Chick, liked the story and signed on to develop the film, making it the first female-driven movie produced by his company. The working title of the film was I Know What Boys Like.

The film was shot over the summer of 2007. Faris had a nude scene originally meant to be filmed with a body double, but she decided to do the scene herself.

Reception

Critical reception
On Rotten Tomatoes The House Bunny has an approval rating of 43% based on 125 reviews, with an average rating of 5.10/10. The site's critical consensus reads, "Anna Faris is game, but she can't salvage this middling, formulaic comedy." On Metacritic, the film has a weighted average score of 55 out of 100, based on 22 critics, indicating "mixed or average reviews". Audiences polled by CinemaScore gave the film an average grade of "B+" on an A+ to F scale.

Varietys John Anderson stated the film is a "Blissfully broad comedy that should catapult Anna Faris into a singular kind of stardom." Nathan Lee of The New York Times wrote the film "puts a cheerful spin on its many clichés", and "this particular wheel hasn’t been reinvented, but at least it gets a nice fresh coat of bubblegum-pink paint and a star to pilot it with aplomb."

Box office
On August 22, 2008, The House Bunny was released in the US. It debuted at #1 on its first day of release making $5.91 million, but ultimately landed in second place for its opening weekend, making $14.53 million, behind Ben Stiller's action-comedy film Tropic Thunder, which made $16.2 million. The film grossed $70 million worldwide ($48 million in North America and $22 million internationally). The film debuted in the UK chart at #1 grossing almost $1 million in its first weekend.

Home media
The film was released on DVD and Blu-ray on December 19, 2008. It was also released in a 6-movie collection called The Laugh Out Loud Collection with other Happy Madison films in 2013.

Music
Though a soundtrack was not released, a single was released to iTunes on July 16, 2008. The single was a cover of The Waitresses song, "I Know What Boys Like" (produced by Chad Hugo of The Neptunes) as performed by Katharine McPhee (featuring Kat Dennings, Emma Stone, and Rumer Willis) and including lyrics about the Zeta sisters. The trailers for the film included the songs "U + Ur Hand" by P!nk and "Do It Well" by Jennifer Lopez. The film also featured songs by artists including:

 Bow Wow Wow – "I Want Candy"
 The All-American Rejects – "I Wanna"
 Altered Images – "Happy Birthday"
 Madonna – "Like a Virgin"
 Rihanna – "Take a Bow"
 The Pussycat Dolls – "When I Grow Up"
 Ashlee Simpson – "Boys"
 Metro Station – "Shake It"
 DJ Colette – "Think You Want It" produced by Tim K
 The Cab – "I'll Run"
 Elizaveta – "Like Water"
 Yael Naim – "New Soul"
 The Kills – "Sour Cherry"
 Boys Like Girls – "The Great Escape"
 The Ting Tings – "Great DJ" and "Shut Up and Let Me Go"
 Ingrid Michaelson – "Be OK"
 Avril Lavigne – "Girlfriend"
 Mercedes – Better Than a Psychic

References

External links
 
 
 
 

2008 films
2000s buddy comedy films
2008 romantic comedy films
2000s teen comedy films
2000s teen romance films
Alta Loma Entertainment films
American female buddy films
American romantic comedy films
American teen comedy films
American teen romance films
Columbia Pictures films
2000s English-language films
Films about fraternities and sororities
Films directed by Fred Wolf
Films produced by Adam Sandler
Films produced by Allen Covert
Happy Madison Productions films
Films set in country houses
Films set in Wyoming
Relativity Media films
Films about Playboy
2000s female buddy films
2000s American films